Yigal and Yigael are given names. People with those names include:

Yigal Allon (1918–80), Israeli politician, acting Prime Minister, a commander of the Palmach, and general
Yigal Amir (born 1970), Israeli assassin of Prime Minister of Israel Yitzhak Rabin 
Yigal Antebi (born 1974), Israeli football player 
Yigal Arnon (1929-2014), Israeli lawyer and founder of Yigal Arnon & Co.
Yigal Azrouël, Israeli-American fashion designer
Yigal Bibi (born 1942), Israeli politician 
Yigal Carmon, president and founder of the Middle East Media Research Institute (MEMRI)
Yigal Cohen (1928–88), Israeli politician
Yigal Cohen-Orgad (born 1937), Israeli politician
Yigal Hurvitz (1918–94), Israeli politician 
Yigal Menahem (born 1963), Israeli football player and lawyer
Yigal Mossinson (1917–94), Israeli novelist
Yigal Naor (born 1958), Israeli actor
Yigal Tumarkin (born 1933), Israeli painter
Igal Volodarsky (also Igal Dar) (1936-1977), Israeli basketball player
Yigael Yadin (1917–84), Israeli archeologist, politician, and the second Chief of Staff of the IDF
Yigal Yasinov (born 1966), Israeli politician

See also
 Igal (disambiguation), the Anglicized form of Yigal
Yigal Arnon & Co. (founded in 1957), an Israeli law firm